Francisca Bazalo Gallego (born 5 May 1962 in Málaga) is a Spanish épée and foil wheelchair fencer.

She fenced at the 1992 Summer Paralympics and the 1996 Summer Paralympics, where she finished third in the épée team both times. She also fenced at the 2000 Summer Paralympics in Sydney, Australia, but did not finish in the top 3.

References

External links 
 
 

1962 births
Living people
Spanish female épée fencers
Paralympic wheelchair fencers of Spain
Paralympic gold medalists for Spain
Paralympic bronze medalists for Spain
Paralympic medalists in wheelchair fencing
Wheelchair fencers at the 1992 Summer Paralympics
Wheelchair fencers at the 1996 Summer Paralympics
Wheelchair fencers at the 2000 Summer Paralympics
Medalists at the 1992 Summer Paralympics
Medalists at the 1996 Summer Paralympics
Sportspeople from Málaga
Spanish female foil fencers